Fabrizio Ravasi (born 24 June 1965) is an Italian lightweight rower. He won a gold medal at the 1985 World Rowing Championships in Hazewinkel with the lightweight men's eight.

References

External links
 

1965 births
Living people
Italian male rowers
World Rowing Championships medalists for Italy
Rowers of Fiamme Oro
Rowers from Milan